The Pelhams may refer to:

Brent Pelham, Furneux Pelham and Stocking Pelham, villages in Hertfordshire, England
The Pelhams, New York, an area of Westchester County, New York